Tachigahata Dam  is a gravity dam located in Hyogo Prefecture in Japan. The dam is used for water supply. The catchment area of the dam is 18.9 km2. The dam impounds about 11  ha of land when full and can store 1248 thousand cubic meters of water. The construction of the dam was started on 1901 and completed in 1905.

See also
List of dams in Japan

References

Dams in Hyogo Prefecture